TVN HD was launched on August 28, 2007 it became available on digital platform n which also belongs to ITI Group The channel broadcasts TVN's programmes in 1080i and 16:9. On 1 May 2010, a timeshift channel of TVN HD was made called TVN HD+1.

TVN HD+1
On May 1, 2010 ITI Group launched a timeshift channel which is called TVN HD+1 and broadcasts TVN's programmes in 1080i and 16:9 with a one-hour delay time.

TVN HD+1 was closed on January 31, 2012.

See also
TVN

High-definition television
TVN (Polish TV channel)
Television channels in Poland